The Celtiberian confederacy was a tribal federation formed around the mid-3rd century BC, by the Arevaci, Lusones, Belli and Titii, with the Arevacian city of Numantia as the federal capital. 

During the Second Punic War the confederacy kept itself neutral, though Celtiberian mercenaries are mentioned fighting for both sides on a number of occasions. The first Roman incursion into the Celtiberian heartland occurred around 195 BC under Consul Cato the Elder, who attacked unsuccessfully the towns of Seguntia Celtiberorum and Numantia, where he allegedly delivered a speech to the numantines.   

Upon the fall of Numantia in 134-133 BC, the Romans forcibly disbanded the Celtiberian confederacy and allowed the Pellendones’ and Uraci to regain their independence from the Arevaci, who were now technically submitted and absorbed into Hispania Citerior province.

See also 
Celtiberian Wars
Numantine War
Pre-Roman peoples of the Iberian Peninsula

Notes

References 
Ángel Montenegro et alii, Historia de España 2 - colonizaciones y formación de los pueblos prerromanos (1200-218 a.C), Editorial Gredos, Madrid (1989) 
Alberto José Lorrio Alvarado, Los Celtíberos, Universidad Complutense de Madrid, Murcia (1997) 
Francisco Burillo Mozota, Los Celtíberos, etnias y estados, Crítica, Barcelona (1998, revised edition 2007) 
Rafael Trevino and Angus McBride, Rome's Enemies (4): Spanish Armies 218BC-19BC, Men-at-Arms series 180, Osprey Publishing, London (1986) 
J. Alberto Arenas  Esteban & Mª Victoria Palacios Tamayo, El origen del mundo celtibérico, Excmº Ayuntamiento de Molina de Aragón (1999)

Further reading
Aedeen Cremin, The Celts in Europe, Sydney, Australia: Sydney Series in Celtic Studies 2, Centre for Celtic Studies, University of Sydney (1992) .
Dáithí Ó hÓgáin, The Celts: A History, The Collins Press, Cork (2002) 

John T. Koch (ed.), Celtic Culture: A Historical Encyclopedia, ABC-CLIO Inc., Santa Barbara, California (2006) , 1-85109-445-8

External links
http://www.celtiberia.net

Tribes in Greco-Roman historiography
Pre-Roman peoples of the Iberian Peninsula